Francine Leca (born on 20 May 1938) is a French cardiac surgeon and professor of medicine specializing in heart surgery, a pioneer of the discipline in pediatrics.

Biography 
Francine Leca gravitated toward medicine at a very young age. During an internship in cardiac surgery under professor Jean Mathey at Laennec Hospital, she assisted her first open heart surgery. As an intern at hôpitaux de Paris, she discovered pediatric cardiac surgery under Professor George Lemoine. She went on to specialize in congenital heart defects.

She was the first woman to become a cardiac surgeon in France, and was the chief of services of cardiac surgery, first at Laennec Hospital and then Necker (Paris) until 2003.

In 1996 Leca along with Patrice Roynette founded the organization  - Enfant du Monde (Mécénat Cardiac Surgery - Child of the World) which raises funds to treat children with serious heart conditions who could not otherwise receive treatment in their home countries.

Distinctions 

 Grand officer of the Legion of Honour
 Grand officer of the ordre national du Mérite

Honors 

 The  Prize of Tolerance 2015.
  of 1998

Bibliography 

 Elizabeth Drévillon, Professeur Leca : Chirurgien du cœur, Éditions Anne Carrière, 2003. 
 Elide Montesi, « Francine Leca », in Les filles d'Hippocrate, Les Éditions Acrodacrolivres, 2014,

References

External links 

 « Francine Leca, à cœur ouvert », À voix nue, par Claire Pouly-Borgeaud. Réalisation : Rafik Zenine. France Culture, May 2016.

 Margaux Rambert, « Francine Leca, à cœur ouvert », psychologies.com, November 2010.

1938 births
Living people
20th-century French physicians
21st-century French physicians
French women physicians
French cardiac surgeons
Women surgeons
Grand Officiers of the Légion d'honneur
Commanders of the Ordre national du Mérite
21st-century women physicians
20th-century women physicians
Women cardiologists